Bilingual–Bicultural or Bi-Bi deaf education programs use sign language as the native, or first, language of Deaf children. In the United States, for example, Bi-Bi proponents claim that American Sign Language (ASL) should be the natural first language for deaf children in the United States, although the majority of deaf and hard of hearing being born to hearing parents. In this same vein, the spoken or written language used by the majority of the population is viewed as a secondary language to be acquired either after or at the same time as the native language.

In Bi-Bi education, a signed language is the primary method of instruction. The bicultural aspect of Bi-Bi education emphasizes Deaf culture and strives to create confidence in deaf students by exposing them to the Deaf community.

Various studies have found a correlation between ASL skill level and English literacy or reading comprehension. The most plausible explanation for this is that ASL skill level predicts English literacy level. Having a basis of American Sign Language can benefit the acquisition of the English language. In fact, bilingual children show more development in cognitive, linguistic, and meta-linguistic processes than their monolingual peers.

36% to 40% of residential and day schools for deaf students in the US report using Bi-Bi education programs.

Sweden and Denmark are two countries known for their bilingual–bicultural education of deaf children. Sweden passed a law in 1981 that mandated bilingualism as a goal of deaf education. Denmark recognized sign language as an equal language and espoused sign language as the primary method of instruction in schools for the deaf in 1991.

Notable examples of schools utilizing the Bi-Bi method in the US include The Learning Center for the Deaf in Massachusetts and the Illinois School for the Deaf, which uses cued speech to maintain a language separation between ASL and English.

Bilingual-Bicultural Movement 

Marie Jean Philip was a pioneer in the Bilingual-Bicultural (Bi-Bi) movement. In 1985, The Learning Center for Deaf Children in Framingham, Massachusetts, was able to convince Philip to begin a new career as Special Assistant to the Director for Implementation of Bilingual/Bicultural Policies. After two years, Philip agreed to take on the full-time position of Bilingual Bicultural Coordinator, which she held from 1988. Philip led the school into the Bi-Bi education system.

The Learning Center for the Deaf became the first Deaf school in the United States to officially adopt a Bilingual-Bicultural teaching philosophy. Schools in California, Indiana, and Maryland soon also officially adopted Bilingual-Bicultural teaching philosophies.

On September 24, 2018, Carey M. Ballard published a thirty-minute documentary film, Bilingual-Bicultural Movement at The Learning Center for the Deaf, which examines the history of the movement.

History 
Bilingual–bicultural education is based on Cummins' Model of Linguistic Interdependence. In 1976, James Cummins predicted that proficiency in a first language would correlate to competence in a second language because a single cognitive process underlies language acquisition for both languages. After decades of using the oral method of education, some advocates sought a new method for teaching deaf students. Many schools then began to use systems of Manually Coded English (MCE) in an attempt to develop English in deaf students. After the perceived failure of Manually Coded English systems, some educators began using the bilingual–bicultural model.

Socio-emotional impact 
Research has shown links between sociocultural factors and students' educational success. Learning in their first language allows students to feel a sense of belonging, leading to their academic success, including development in their two languages. The bilingual teaching approach creates meaningful academic experiences for students when cultural factors are recognized. The cultural aspect of the bicultural bilingual approach enhances deaf students' experiences success in school. The school climate in a bicultural-bilingual setting gives students the opportunity to foster their academic, cognitive and socio-cultural skills in two languages.

Lev Vygotsky, a former Soviet psychologist renowned for his study on social cognitive development, argued that the quality and quantity of children's play is contingent upon the language shared among children. Piaget, another psychologist renowned for his child development study, and Vygotsky agreed that language plays a significant role in cognitive and social development, because language competence significantly shapes play behaviors. When deaf children are in a Bi-Bi setting where they have access to language and the full ability to communicate with their peers, they are developing and fine-tuning their cognitive and social skills.

A study on deaf children and theory of mind (ToM), which is essentially the ability to put oneself in someone else's shoes, showed no differences in performance in theory of mind tasks between deaf children of deaf parents and their hearing peers. This means that deaf children with deaf parents were advantaged in having acquired language from birth. Deaf children with hearing parents, whether they were educated using spoken English or ASL, showed delays in two ToM tasks, false beliefs and knowledge states. It is worth mentioning that not all deaf children born with hearing parents are linguistically disadvantaged because hearing parents can acquire sign language to communicate with their deaf children.

The primary cause of delays in theory of mind is the lack of access to conversations in the environmental, opportunities for incidental learning, and the difficulty in communicating about daily routines. Those create challenges in discussing thoughts, beliefs and intentions among deaf children lacking language. When deaf children are exposed to natural and accessible language from an early age, they do not have delays in theory of mind reasoning and demonstrate a high capacity in understanding and reasoning about others' minds. Evidence have suggested that there is a correlation between having a strong theory of mind and a strong language foundation. It can be argued that the Bi-Bi approach provides deaf children with optimal access to language to support typical socio-emotional development.

Deaf children use sign to express themselves, discuss events, ask questions, and refer to things in their settings, just as hearing children use spoken language. The human brain is naturally wired to crave information and constant access to communication, and social settings with accessible language provide that. The earlier that Deaf children have the chance to naturally acquire sign language with constant language input, the better their cognitive and social skills, because they are able to receive information about actions, objects, experiences, and events in time.

References

 Unlocking the Curriculum: Principles for Achieving Access in Deaf Education by Robert E. Johnson, Scott Liddell and Carol Erting, 1989.
 Bilingual/Bicultural Deaf Education Is Appropriate
 Mahshie, Shawn Neal. 1995. Educating Deaf Children Bilingually--With Insights and Applications from Sweden and Denmark. National government publication. Washington, D.C.: Pre-College Programs, Gallaudet University
 J. Clemmons and F. Hoctor (eds.). 1973. Annual International Multilingual, Multicultural Conference: Proceedings (1st, San Diego, California, April 1-5, 1973). Sacramento, CA: Bilingual–Bicultural Task Force
 Grosjean, Francois. 2001. The Right of the Deaf Child to Grow up Bilingual. Sign Language Studies, Vol. 1, No. 2, pp. 110–114. (PDF)

See also
 Nothing More Nothing Less--A French-Canadian View of Bilingualism and Biculturalism (1967)

Deafness
Deaf culture
Bilingual education
Education for the deaf
Sign language